Jahazgarh or Jahajgarh is a prominent village in Jhajjar District, State Haryana, India. The 1,320 megawatts Jhajjar Thermal Power Project is about 20 km from the village.

Demography 
The total population is 4724, of which 2465 are male and 2259 female.

History 
Jahazgarh was founded by an Irish adventurer, named George Thomas and built a fort here known as Georgegarh after which the village is known by its present name, Jahazgarh.

Education 
Government Senior Secondary School (from 6th standard to 12th standard) is one of three government schools of Jahazgarh. It is situated on Jahazgarh-Beri road. As a 'nodal' point, Jahazgarh serves commercial and educational functions to surrounding villages.
Building of the school was constructed in the year 1956 by the Bansal family, native businessman who are now living in Kolkata/Delhi in memory of their grandfather late Sri Sudhan Lal Bansal. Recent renovation and construction of additional rooms by the Bansal family has greatly improved its infrastructure and made it an ideal School in the area which can be upgraded to college.
Many sport events are regularly held there, though cricket tournaments have been the major ones.
Late Prime Minister Mrs. Indira Gandhi once visited the school and addressed the people at its playground.

Government Girl Higher Secondary School (from 1st standard to 10th standard) is considered as one of the best government school in whole Haryana for its infrastructure. It was also constructed by a village businessman in the memory of his father Pandit Shiv Chand Rai, a famous businessman and industrialist who also resides in Kolkata. The building was constructed in 1974–1975. Its prime object was to enhance the standard of education among girls. It is situated along Delhi-Dadari state highway.

The third government school in the village is Primary School (1st standard to 5th standard) is situated at the center of the village Harsh Badgujer.

Public health center 
A local government public health center provides basic health facilities to local and surrounding villagers.

Veterinary hospital 
A veterinary hospital is situated at the cattle fair ground.

Drinking water 
A drinking water supply system was set up by villagers through individual and community efforts. It is maintained and managed by a village committee.
Water connection is provided to each house. Late Iahwar Singh Sansanwal was the head of committee. In 2016, a government water supply system was established. Nowadays, it is the main source of drinking water.

Communication 
The village has one small telephone exchange, established by BSNL, which provides land line telephones facility.

Recreation 
At the Government S.S. School's playground main sport events are held. This also happens at the southern part of the village, in the place known as Bara has Haryanvi 'akhara' where 'kusti' (wrestling) were practices and tournaments are conducted.

A privately run cable network provides cable TV service to the villagers.

A small public Library in main Chhopal building has good a collection of books and subscription to many daily newspapers. Library has become a source of intellectual and educational growth for the villagers.

Other infrastructure 
The electric distribution station, power house, of the village distributes electricity to Jahazgarh and the surrounding villages. One branch of a bank and one branch of Co-Operative Society is also provide the facility of bank to the villagers and the surrounding villagers. A beautiful community hall (Chaupal) placed in middle of village in front of govt primary school which was built by the Baniya family. It is free for all villagers.

A holy temple of Sheetla mata situated in Jahazgarh village.

References 

Villages in Jhajjar district